Danijel Kovacic (born July 3, 1987) is a German professional ice hockey goaltender. He is currently playing for Krefeld Pinguine in the Deutsche Eishockey Liga (DEL).

References

External links

1987 births
Living people
German ice hockey goaltenders
Krefeld Pinguine players
People from Rosenheim
Sportspeople from Upper Bavaria